Droiders is a Spanish software company that focuses on mobile and web apps, and it is an official developer for Google Glass apps. The company was founded in 2008 by computer engineer Juilán Beltrán.  Droiders was a finalist for the Android Developer Challenge in 2008; winners of the Telefónica Challenge and Movilforum in 2009, and they were selected in 2013 by Google as one of the first 80 to test and develop software for Google Glass devices.

Milestones
 The first live-broadcast surgical operation in the world was held on 21 June 2013 by the surgeon Pedro Guillén.
 The first application Google Glass for blind people. The app enables them to read. 
 The first Augmented Reality app for Google Glass.
 The first bank app for Google Glass for BancSabadell.
 The first live broadcast for Google Glass in a charity event with Starlite show.
 The second application that allows reading of the El Mundo newspaper in Google Glass. 
 The first live-broadcast maxillofacial surgery held on 26 October 2013 by three Spanish dentists (Peña, Piqueras y López) with Google Glass.
 The first live-broadcast surgery in Portugal with Google Glass.
 The first app that enables watching TV with Google Glass, developed for Spanish TV group RTVE.

References

External links 
 

Software companies of Spain
Software companies established in 2008
Companies based in the Region of Murcia
Spanish companies established in 2008